The Razzie Award for Worst Supporting Actor is an award presented at the annual Golden Raspberry Awards to the worst supporting actor of the previous year. The following is a list of nominees and recipients of that award, along with the film(s) for which they were nominated.

The category of "actor" has expanded to include the subjects of documentary films.

Winners and nominees

1980s

1990s

2000s

2010s

2020s

Multiple wins
2 wins
Dan Aykroyd
Hayden Christensen

Multiple nominations

5 nominations
 Arnold Schwarzenegger

4 nominations
 Burt Reynolds

3 nominations
 Dan Aykroyd
 Billy Barty
 Marlon Brando
 Danny DeVito
 Mel Gibson
 Rob Schneider
 Sylvester Stallone
 Nick Swardson
 Jon Voight    

2 nominations
 Chevy Chase
 Hayden Christensen
 Billy Ray Cyrus
 Robert Duvall
 Ben Gazzara
 Kevin James
 Val Kilmer
 Ben Kingsley
 Taylor Lautner
 Jared Leto
 Chris O'Donnell
 Al Pacino
 Tyler Perry
 Keanu Reeves
 Christopher Walken
 Bruce Willis
 Burt Young

See also

Golden Raspberry Award for Worst Supporting Actress

Notes

References

External links
 Official Razzie website

Golden Raspberry Awards by category